Leucoptera cytisiphagella is a moth in the family Lyonetiidae. It is found in Hungary and Bulgaria.

The larvae feed on Chamaecytisus austriacus. They mine the leaves of their host plant. The mine starts as a very narrow gallery descending along the leaf margin until about halfway down. Then the corridor widens into a blotch that eventually becomes full depth and occupies the entire leaflet. The frass is deposited in a central accumulation. Pupation takes place outside of the mine.

References

Leucoptera (moth)
Moths described in 1938
Moths of Europe